People's Will (Moldovan Cyrillic: Войнцэ Популарэ;) is a political party in Transnistria. It is affiliated with the Russian nationalist People's Union led by State Duma Vice Speaker Sergey Baburin.

It was formed on 11 December 2006 by members of Transnistria's Supreme Council. Its leader is Oleg Gudymo, a former Transnistrian MP. Another Transnistrian MP, Grigore Mărăcuță, was present at the founding congress, as well as Sergey Baburin, and Nataliya Vitrenko, the leader of the left-wing Progressive Socialist Party of Ukraine.

External links 
 Interview with party leader Gudymo (April 2007)

Political parties in Transnistria
Political parties established in 2006